Tuu or TUU may refer to:

As a name
Tuu (band) (1980s–1999), British ambient band
Tuu languages, spoken in Botswana and South Africa
Xuan Tuu (1925–1996), Vietnamese writer properly addressed as Tuu
Tuu, fictional homeworld of Lugians in the game Asheron's Call 2

As an abbreviation
Tasmania University Union, in Australia

As a code
Tabuk Regional Airport, in Saudi Arabia, IATA code TUU

See also
 Kings of Easter Island, many including "Tuu" in their name
 Kyzyl-Tuu, several places in Kyrgyzstan